Exarrhenus is a genus of beetle in the family Cerambycidae. Its only species is Exarrhenus egens. It was described by Pascoe in 1864.

References

Pteropliini
Beetles described in 1864